Central Canada (sometimes the Central provinces) is a region consisting of Canada's two largest and most populous provinces: Ontario and Quebec. Geographically, they are not at the centre of Canada but instead overlap with Eastern Canada toward the east. Because of their large populations, Ontario and Quebec have traditionally held a significant amount of political power in Canada, leading to some amount of resentment from other regions of the country. Before Confederation, the term "Canada" specifically referred to Central Canada. Today, the term "Central Canada" is less often used than the names of the individual provinces.

Geography 
The longitudinal centre of Canada passes just east of Winnipeg, Manitoba; the geographic centre of Canada is located near Baker Lake, Nunavut.

Before Confederation, the region known as Canada was what is now called Central Canada. Southern Ontario was once called Upper Canada and later Canada West, and southern Quebec was called Lower Canada and later Canada East. Both were part of the United Province of Canada in 1841.

Population 
Combined, the two provinces are home to approximately 23 million inhabitants, representing 62% of Canada's total population. They are represented in the House of Commons of Canada by 199 Members of Parliament Ontario: 121, Quebec: 78 out of a total of 338. The southern portions of the two provinces — particularly the Quebec City–Windsor Corridor — are the most urbanized and industrialized areas of Canada, containing the country's two largest cities, Toronto and Montreal and the national capital, Ottawa.

Census Metropolitan Areas, 2016 Census

 Toronto, ON: 5,928,040
 Montréal, QC: 4,098,927
 Ottawa, ON–Gatineau, QC: 1,323,783
 Québec, QC: 800,296
 Hamilton, ON: 747,545
 Kitchener, ON: 523,894
 London, ON: 494,069
 St. Catharines–Niagara, ON: 406,074
 Oshawa, ON: 379,848
 Windsor, ON: 329,144
 Sherbrooke, QC: 212,105
 Barrie, ON: 197,059
 Sudbury, ON: 164,689
 Kingston, ON: 161,175
 Saguenay, QC: 160,980
 Trois-Rivières, QC: 156,042
 Guelph, ON: 151,984
 Peterborough, ON: 121,721
 Brantford, ON: 134,203
 Thunder Bay, ON: 121,621
 Belleville, ON: 103,472

See also 

 Central United States
 Great Lakes region
 List of regions of Canada

References

Regions of Canada